John Clive (6 January 1933 – 14 October 2012) was an English actor and author, known internationally for his historical and social fiction, such as KG200 and Barossa.

Clive was also an established British television and film actor. Beginning his career at the age of fourteen touring in rep, he went on to star on the West End stage, in plays such as Absurd Person Singular, The Wizard of Oz, Under Milk Wood, The Bandwagon at the Mermaid Theatre, The Winslow Boy, Young Woodley and Life with Father.

As a character actor he appeared in comic and straight acting roles in films, such as The Italian Job, Yellow Submarine, The Pink Panther Strikes Again, A Clockwork Orange and The Young Indiana Jones Chronicles. He was a member of the Carry On Team appearing in two of the Carry on series of comedy films; Carry On Abroad, and Carry On Dick  Clive was initiated into the Grand Order of Water Rats in 1988.

Career

Acting

Other film appearances include the Ealing Studios comedy The Magnet, credited as Clive Kendall. In the Beatles' animated film Yellow Submarine he provided the voice of John Lennon. His television appearances also included Robert's Robots, Rising Damp, The Dick Emery Show, The Perils of Pendragon, The Sweeney, Great Expectations and The History of Mr Polly. He appeared in the first Wednesday Play, Wear a Very Big Hat, broadcast by BBC 1 in 1964. Clive also featured in Lady Windermere's Fan, One Way Out and The Ten Percenters. He featured in a 1970s advert for Jacob's Coconut Cream Biscuits.

Author

In 1977,  he co wrote the historical novel KG 200 with J.D. Gilman, a story about a secret Luftwaffe unit during the Second World War. This book was an international best-seller. The Last Liberator, followed in 1980 and was well received by literary critics. Barossa  also achieved critical acclaim. Broken Wings was published in 1983 and matched the international success of KG 200. Other fictional titles written by Clive followed including Ark co-written with Nicholas Headin, in 1986 which also received good reviews  and The Lions' Cage which was published in 1988.

Death
John Clive died after a short illness on 14 October 2012 in England aged 79.

Bibliography
Clive, John and Gilman J. D. KG 200: The Force with no Face. Simon and Schuster (1977). 
Clive, John. The Last Liberator. Hamlyn (1980). 
Clive, John. Barossa. Delacorte Press (1981). 
Clive, John. Broken Wings. Granada (1983). 
Clive, John and Head, Nicholas. Ark. Penguin (1986). 
Clive, John. The Lions Cage. Penguin (1988).

Filmography

Feature films
Credits include:

 The Magnet (1950) - The people of Merseyside
 Smashing Time (1967) - Sweeney Todd manager
 The Mini-Affair (1967) - Joe
 Yellow Submarine (1968) - John (voice)
 The Italian Job (1969) - Garage Manager
 A Nice Girl Like Me (1969) - Supermarket Shopper
 Tintin and the Temple of the Sun (1969) - Thomson (English version, voice, uncredited)
 Carry On Henry (1971) - Court Dandy (scenes deleted)
 A Clockwork Orange (1971) - Stage Actor
 Four Dimensions of Greta (1972) - Phil the Greek
 Straight on Till Morning (1972) - Newsagent
 Go for a Take (1972) - Hotel Waiter
 Carry On Abroad (1972) - Robin
 Tiffany Jones (1973) - Stefan
 Carry On Dick (1974) - Isaac the Tailor
 Great Expectations (1974) - Mr. Wopsle
 Never Too Young to Rock (1976) - Bandsman
 No Longer Alone (1976) - Basil
 Queen Kong (1976) - Comedian
 The Pink Panther Strikes Again (1976) - Chuck
 Hardcore (1977) - Willi
 Stand Up, Virgin Soldiers (1977) - Man in wheelchair
 Rosie Dixon - Night Nurse (1978) - Grieves
 Let's Get Laid (1978) - Piers Horrabin
 Revenge of the Pink Panther (1978) - President's Aide
 RPM (1998) - Bentley Man (final film role)

Television
Credits include:

The Wednesday Play (1965) - Billy Moffatt
Watch the Birdies  (1966) - Lenny
Z-Cars  (1967) - Fred
"Who Said Anything About the Law?: Part 2
"Who Said Anything About the Law?: Part 1
The Saint  (1967) - Garton
The Informer  (1967) - News photographer
Man in a Suitcase  (1967) - Clerk
The Gnomes of Dulwich  (1969) - Old
"Episode No.1.5"
"Episode No.1.4"
"Episode No.1.3"
"Episode No.1.2"
"Episode No.1.1"
Here Come the Double Deckers (1971)
Father, Dear Father (1971) - Auctioneer
The Man Outside  (1972) - Rosko
The World of Cilla (1973)
Great Expectations (1974) - Mr. Wopsle
Robert's Robots (1973-1974) - Robert Sommerby / Robert Robot
The Perils of Pendragon  (1974) - Rosko
The Sweeney  (1975) - John Frewin
How Green Was My Valley  (1975-1976) - Cyfartha
"Episode No.1.6"
"Episode No.1.5"
"Episode No.1.4"
"Episode No.1.3"
"Episode No.1.2"
The Galton and Simpson Playhouse  (1977) - Man in Phonebox
"Naught for Thy Comfort"
Rising Damp - (1977-1978) - Gwyn / Samaritan 
Odd Man Out  (1977) - TV Reporter
The Chiffy Kids (1978) - Mr. Melrose
Rings on Their Fingers  (1978) - The Salesman
"Party Mood"
Leave It to Charlie  (1979) - Andy Kirk
"Money, Money, Money"
The History of Mr. Polly  (1980) - Hinks
"Episode No.1.4"
"Episode No.1.3"
"Episode No.1.2"
The Nesbitts Are Coming  (1980) - PC Emlyn Harris
"Moving Day"
"Look on the Black Side"
"Race Day"
"The Big Job"
"It's All a Game"
A Dream of Alice (1982)
Theatre Night  (1985) - Mr. Dumby
Lady Windermere's Fan
Screen One'  (1989) - Prudoe
"One Way Out"
T-Bag's Christmas Carol  (1989) - Giles Pickens
The 10 Percenters  (1996) - Terry
"Surprise"

Other credits
Documentaries
 Hamlet: The Video (1992)
 The Adventures of Young Indiana Jones: Espionage Escapades (2007)

Appearances in deleted scenes
Carry On Henry / US: Carry on Henry VIII (1971)  "Plotter"

Notes

External links
 
 

1933 births
2012 deaths
English male film actors
English male television actors
English writers
English male writers